Jože Plečnik (23 January 1872 – 7 January 1957) was a Slovene architect who had a major impact on the modern architecture of Vienna, Prague and of Ljubljana, the capital of Slovenia, most notably by designing the iconic Triple Bridge and the Slovene National and University Library building, as well as the embankments along the Ljubljanica River, the Ljubljana Central Market buildings, the Ljubljana cemetery, parks, plazas etc. His architectural imprint on Ljubljana has been compared to the impact Antoni Gaudí had on Barcelona.

His style is associated with the Vienna Secession style of architecture (a type of Art Nouveau). Besides in Ljubljana, he worked in Vienna, Belgrade and on Prague Castle. He influenced the avant-garde Czech Cubism. He is also a founding member of the Ljubljana School of Architecture, joining it upon an invitation by Ivan Vurnik, another notable Ljubljana architect.

Life
Plečnik was born in Maribor,-Duplek present-day Slovenia, the son of Helena (Molka) and Andrej Plečnik. He studied under noted Viennese architect and educator Otto Wagner and worked in Wagner's architecture office until 1900. A woman-friend asked Plečnik to marry her written in a letter. He replied, “I am already married to my architecture.”

Work

From 1900 through 1910, while practicing in the Wagner's office in Vienna, he designed the Langer House (1900) and the Zacherlhaus (1903–1905).

His 1910–1913 Church of the Holy Spirit (Heilig-Geist-Kirche) is remarkable for its innovative use of poured-in-place concrete as both structure and exterior surface, and also for its abstracted classical form language. Most radical is the church's crypt, with its slender concrete columns and angular, cubist capitals and bases.

In 1911, Plečnik moved to Prague, where he taught at the college of arts and crafts. The first president of the new Czechoslovak Republic from 1918 onwards, Tomáš Masaryk, appointed Plečnik chief architect for the 1920 renovation of Prague Castle. From 1920 until 1934 Plečnik completed a wide range of projects at the castle, including renovation of gardens and courtyards, the design and installation of monuments and sculptures, and the design of numerous new interior spaces, including the Plečnik Hall completed in 1930, which features three levels of abstracted Doric colonnades.  His final work in Prague was the Church of the Most Sacred Heart of Our Lord (Roman Catholic, 1929–32).

Upon the 1921 establishment of the Ljubljana School of Architecture in his hometown of Ljubljana, he was invited by the fellow Slovene architect Ivan Vurnik to become a founding faculty member and moved to teach architecture at the University of Ljubljana. Plečnik would remain in Ljubljana until his death, and it is there that his influence as an architect is most noticeable.

Giving the city of Ljubljana its modern identity
Plečnik gave the capital of Slovenia, the city of Ljubljana, its modern identity by designing iconic buildings such as the Slovene National and University Library building. He also designed other notable buildings, including the Vzajemna Insurance Company Offices, and contributed to many civic improvements. He renovated the city's bridges and the Ljubljanica River banks, and designed the Ljubljana Central Market buildings, the Ljubljana cemetery, parks, plazas etc. Buildings designed by Plečnik were built by the constructor Matko Curk.

During the Communist period of Slovene history Plečnik fell out of favor as a Catholic  and his teaching role at the university was gradually reduced because he was over 70 years old. In 1947, at the invitation of the president of the Slovene People’s Assembly to design a new Parliament building, Plečnik proposed the Cathedral of Freedom (also known as the Plečnik Parliament) where he wanted to raze the Ljubljana Castle and to build a monumental octagonal building instead. In 1952, Ljubljana city leaders asked Plečnik to remodel the Križanke monastery into a venue for the Ljubljana Festival, his last big Ljubljana project. Other projects he completed at that time included the renovation of the Prešeren Theater, plus the Plečnik Arcades, stairway and fountain, all in Kranj, the reconstruction of churches, the design of the Pavilion on Brijuni Islands (Tito's summer state residence), and numerous National Liberation War monuments (in Ljubljana-Trnovo, Vipava, Radeče, Črna na Koroškem, Dolenja vas, Sevnica, Laško, Split, Kraljevo, etc.). For his work, he twice received the Prešeren Award, in 1949 and 1952 for his life's work. Plečnik died in 1957 and received an official state funeral in Žale, attended by many political, cultural and church leaders.

Legacy
In the 1980s, with postmodernist interest in Plečnik's work, the general interest in him has been revived, as well, after being forgotten during the 1960s and 1970s. Since then, Plečnik's legacy has been commemorated in various ways, most notably in the 1990s on the Slovene 500 tolar banknote, with the National and University Library of Slovenia depicted on the reverse.

The unrealized Cathedral of Freedom designed by Plečnik is featured on the Slovene 10 cent euro coin. Slovenska akropola is the title of a 1987 album by the Slovene industrial music group Laibach. During August 2008, a maquette of the Parliament was featured at the Project Plečnik exhibition on the architect's life, held at the Council of the European Union building in Brussels, Belgium on the occasion of the Slovene EU Presidency. The exhibition's curator Boris Podrecca described the Parliament as "the most charismatic object" of Plečnik's opus.

In addition, on 23 January 2012, to celebrate the 140th anniversary of Plečnik's birth, a picture of the Triple Bridge was featured as the official Google logo (Doodle) adaptation in Slovenia.

Plečnik's home in Ljubljana houses a museum of his life and work. There are several busts and sculptures of him situated around Ljubljana as reminders of his works and legacy.

In 2021, selected works of Plečnik in Ljubljana and Črna vas were inscribed on the list of World Heritage Sites under the name "The works of Jože Plečnik in Ljubljana – Human Centred Urban Design".

Gallery

Work on Prague Castle

See also
Max Fabiani
Ivan Vurnik

References

Further reading
Berglund, Bruce. (2017), pp. "The Architect Creating for the Ages," in "Castle and Cathedral in Modern Prague: Longing for the Sacred in a Skeptical Age." Budapest and New York. Central European University Press. Pp. 63-108.
Prelovšek, Damjan. (1992) Jože Plečnik: 1872–1957: Architectura perennis. Salzburg. Residenz verlag. Published in English version in 1997 by Yale University Press. 
Margolius, Ivan. (1995) "Jože Plečnik: Church of the Sacred Heart." Architecture in Detail series. London. Phaidon Press.
Krečič, Peter.  (1993) "Plečnik, the complete works." New York. Whitney Library of Design.

External links 

 Virtual museum of Jože Plečnik
 Jože Plečnik on Architectuul

 
Academic staff of the University of Ljubljana
Slovenian Roman Catholics
Architects from Ljubljana
Art Nouveau architects
Members of the Slovenian Academy of Sciences and Arts
Prešeren Award laureates
Slovene Austro-Hungarians
1872 births
1957 deaths
Recipients of the Order of Tomáš Garrigue Masaryk
Burials at Žale
Architects of Roman Catholic churches